This is a table of common forms of African red slip ware.

Notes

References
 Hayes, John. (1972). Late Roman Pottery. London: British School at Rome (hardcover)
 Hayes, John. (1980). "Supplement to Late Roman Pottery". London: British School at Rome. Worldcat

Ancient Roman pottery